A Man ("Aru otoko") is a 2022 Japanese thriller film directed by .

Based on a novel with the same name by Keiichiro Hirano, the film premiered at the Horizons section of the 79th edition of the Venice Film Festival.

Plot

Cast 
 Satoshi Tsumabuki: Akira Kido
 Sakura Andō: Rie Taniguchi
 Masataka Kubota: Daisuke Taniguchi
 Nana Seino: Misuzu Gotō
 Hidekazu Mashima (ja): Kiyoshi Taniguchi
 Kazutoyo Koyabu: Nakakita
 Aito Sakamoto: Yūto Taniguchi
 Miyako Yamaguchi: Hatsue Takemoto
 Kitarō (ja): Itō
 Shinsuke Kato (ja): Yanagisawa
 Yuumi Kawai: Akane
 Denden: Kosuge
 Yōko Maki: Kaori Kido
 Akira Emoto: Norio Komiura

References

External links
 

2022 drama films
Japanese thriller films
Picture of the Year Japan Academy Prize winners